The Mamanwa language is a Central Philippine language spoken by the Mamanwa people. It is spoken in the provinces of Agusan del Norte and Surigao del Norte in the Lake Mainit area of Mindanao, Philippines. It had about 5,000 speakers in 1990.

Mamanwa is a grammatically conservative language, retaining a three-way deictic distinction in its articles which elsewhere is only preserved in some of the Batanic languages.

Before the arrival of Mamanwa speakers in central Samar Island, there had been an earlier group of Negritos on the island.

In addition to this, Francisco Combes, a Spanish friar, had observed the presence of Negritos in the Zamboanga Peninsula "in the Misamis strip" in 1645, although no linguistic data had ever been collected.

References

General references

 
 

Mansakan languages
Endangered Austronesian languages
Aeta languages
Languages of Agusan del Norte
Languages of Surigao del Norte